Must Listen is the second studio album by South Korean singer Seven. The album features the hit single, "Passion", as well as the follow up radio single "Tattoo".

Track listing

Accolades

Charts

Monthly charts

Yearly charts

References

2004 albums
Seven (Korean singer) albums